Lord Huron is an American indie rock band based in Los Angeles. The band is composed of Mark Barry (drums, percussion), Miguel Briseño (bass, keyboard, theremin), Tom Renaud (guitar) and its founder, Ben Schneider (guitar, lead singer).  Following some solo and self-produced EPs, the group's debut album Lonesome Dreams was released in 2012 and their fourth and most recent album Long Lost was released in May 2021.

Lord Huron combines western, folk rock, rock and roll, pop melodies, and the surf rock genres with soundtrack and new age influences to produce a sound described by The Wall Street Journal as having "a decidedly cinematic flair, heavy on mood and evocative imagery. Lord Huron brings to mind the high-lonesome sound of antecedents like the Band, Neil Young, My Morning Jacket and Fleet Foxes".

History

Formation (2010–2011)
Founding member Ben Schneider began writing music in his hometown of Okemos, Michigan. Schneider studied visual arts at the University of Michigan and finished his degree in France, before moving to New York City where he worked for an artist. In 2005, Schneider moved to Los Angeles. In 2010, Schneider formed Lord Huron as a solo project, recording his first few EPs on his own and adding members to help play in live shows. The band's name was inspired by Lake Huron, the lake which Schneider grew up visiting.

Lonesome Dreams (2012–2013)
Lord Huron's first full-length album, Lonesome Dreams, was released on October 9, 2012. It debuted at No. 5 on Billboards Heatseekers Albums chart.

With the release of Lonesome Dreams, the band released a series of music videos filmed in a western '70s style, which Schneider says was the focal point and narrative for the album. "We had this fun idea that Lonesome Dreams was kind of this series of old adventure tales." In an interview, Schneider alluded to influence from a specific work, called The Collected Works of Billy the Kid: Left-Handed Poems. "It's sort of a collection of pulp fiction and we wanted the videos to kind of reflect that and have that same feel and style", Schneider said during another interview. They also decided to release a theatrical version of the videos.

Strange Trails (2014–2017)
The band released their second album, Strange Trails, on April 6, 2015 in the UK and April 7, 2015 in the US. The album debuted on the Billboard 200 at No. 23, Folk Albums at No. 1, and No. 10 on the Top Album Sales chart with 18,000 copies sold. The song "The Night We Met" was RIAA certified gold on June 26, 2017 and certified platinum on February 15, 2018.

Vide Noir (2018–2020)
In January 2018, several short videos with audio clips on Lord Huron's Facebook, Instagram, and Twitter accounts led to speculation of an album release. The band's third album, Vide Noir, was announced to be released on April 20, 2018.

On January 26, 2018, Lord Huron released their first single from the album, a two-part song called "Ancient Names". On February 16, 2018, the band released the next single, "Wait by the River". On March 7, 2018 they performed the song on Jimmy Kimmel Live!.

Lord Huron performed an extended preview of Vide Noir on March 8, 2018, at Teragram Ballroom in Los Angeles. They debuted five songs off the new album: "Ancient Names (Part I)", "Ancient Names (Part II)", "Wait by the River", "Never Ever", and "Vide Noir". On March 27, 2018, they performed another preview set at Le Poisson Rouge in New York. They played the same five new songs as at Teragram Ballroom plus two more songs from the yet-to-be-released album, "When the Night Is Over" and "Back from the Edge".

On the day of the album release, April 20, 2018, Lord Huron played a release show in Grand Rapids in Schneider's home state of Michigan.

On July 11, 2018, Lord Huron recorded two Spotify Singles, "When the Night is Over" and Neil Young's "Harvest Moon" at Spotify Studios.

On August 11, 2018, the band performed a medley of "Never Ever, When the Night is Over" and "Moonbeam" from Vide Noir on the CBS This Morning: Saturday Sessions.

Long Lost (2021–present)

In December 2020, the band announced a collection of live-streamed shows entitled Alive from Whispering Pines. The first episode aired on January 7, 2021, and featured a clip of previously-unreleased material. On February 19, 2021, a day after the second episode of Alive from Whispering Pines, the band released a new single, "Not Dead Yet".

On March 18, 2021, the third episode of Alive from Whispering Pines concluded with the supposed title of their upcoming fourth studio album, Long Lost, as well as an expected release date of May 21, 2021. This was confirmed when the album became available for pre-order on iTunes, Amazon, and other music vendors. On March 19, 2021, the "Mine Forever" single was released, which had been previewed in the second episode of Alive from Whispering Pines. On April 30, 2021, another single from Long Lost was released, "I Lied", featuring American singer-songwriter Allison Ponthier.

The album was released on the band's Whispering Pines label on May 21, 2021 to mostly positive reviews.

Band members

Current
 Ben Schneider – guitar, vocals, harmonica
 Mark Barry – drums, percussion, vocals
 Miguel Briseño – bass, keys, percussion, theremin
 Tom Renaud – guitar, vocals

Touring

 Brandon Walters – guitar, vocals
 Misty Boyce – keys, vocals

Former

 Peter Mowry – guitar
 Brett Farkas – guitar, vocals
 Karl Kerfoot – guitar, vocals
 Anne Williamson – keys, vocals

Discography

Albums

Extended plays
Into the Sun EP (self-released, 2010)
Mighty EP (Linian Music, 2010)
Time to Run EP (Iamsound, 2012)

Singles

Notes

References

Musical groups from Los Angeles
Musical groups established in 2010
American indie folk groups
Indie pop groups from California
2012 debut albums
Iamsound Records artists
Republic Records artists
2010 establishments in California